Răzvan Ștefan Popa (born 4 January 1997) is a Romanian professional footballer. Mainly a central defender, he can also play as a central midfielder.

Club career
Popa was born in Râmnicu Vâlcea, and was a FC Sportul Studențesc București youth graduate. He made his Romanian Liga I debut at 15 years and 2 months of age, when he was substituted in the stoppage time on 17 March 2012 against Dinamo București.

In August 2013, Popa joined Internazionale Milano after the Italian side battled Chelsea for him. However, he only appeared for the Primavera team during the course of three seasons.

On 21 July 2016, Popa signed a three-year contract with Spanish Segunda División side Real Zaragoza. He made his debut for the club on 7 September, starting and scoring his team's only in a 1–2 home loss against Real Valladolid for the season's Copa del Rey.

In September 2021, he was signed Dinamo București as a free agent.

Honours
Universitatea Craiova
Cupa României: 2017–18
Supercupa României: Runner-up 2018

References

External links
 
 
 
 

1997 births
Living people
Sportspeople from Râmnicu Vâlcea
Romanian footballers
Association football defenders
Association football midfielders
Liga I players
Segunda División players
FC Sportul Studențesc București players
CS Universitatea Craiova players
Inter Milan players
CS Gaz Metan Mediaș players
Real Zaragoza players
Burgos CF footballers
FC Dinamo București players
Romanian expatriate footballers
Romanian expatriate sportspeople in Italy
Romanian expatriate sportspeople in Spain
Expatriate footballers in Italy
Expatriate footballers in Spain